The Maine State League was a Class D level minor league baseball league that played in the 1897, 1907 and 1908 seasons. The eight–team Maine State League consisted of teams based in Maine and New Hampshire. The Maine State League permanently folded after the 1908 season. The Portland (1897), Bangor Cubs (1907) and Bangor White Sox (1908) teams won league championships.

History
An Independent league called the Maine State League briefly played in the 1897 season as a six–team league, beginning play on May 20, 1897. After the Augusta team disbanded on June 26, 1897 and the Rockland team disbanded on July 1, 1897, the league folded on July 5, 1897. The six teams were the Augusta Kennebecs (14–8), Bangor Millionaires (12–19), Belfast Pastimes (10–16), Lewiston (15–14), Portland (21–6) and Rockland (10–19).

The Maine State League was formed for the 1907 season as an eight–team Class D level minor league under the direction of president Fred K. Owen. The Maine State League began play in the 1907 season, hosting franchises from Augusta, Maine (Augusta Senators), Bangor, Maine (Bangor Cubs), Biddeford, Maine (Biddeford Orphans), Lewiston, Maine (Lewiston), Manchester, New Hampshire (Manchester), Portland, Maine (Pine Tree Capers), a second team in Portland (Portland Blue Sox) and Waterville, Maine (Waterville).

The 1907 Maine State League began play on May 24, 1907. The league lost several franchises before the season concluded. Both Manchester and Waterville folded in June, Manchester with a 1–7 record and Waterville with an 8–14 record. The Augusta franchise disbanded on July 29, 1907, with a 27–28 record. Lewiston was 24–24 when that franchise folded on August 3, 1907.

With four teams remaining, the Bangor Cubs won the 1907 Maine State League Championship, finishing with a 47–31 final record, as the league held no playoffs. The Bangor Cubs were followed in the standings by the Biddeford Orphans (30–27), Portland Blue Sox (39-41) and Pine Tree Capers (27–32) in the 1907 standings. The Augusta Senators (27–28), Lewiston (24–23), Manchester (1–7) and Waterville (8–14) all folded before the completion of the season.

Returning to play in what ultimately was their final season of 1908, the Maine State League was a six–team league, maintaining the Class D level. Augusta, the Bangor White Sox, Biddeford, and the Portland Blue Sox comprised the 1908 league members who finished the 1908 season, as Pine Tree and York Beach disbanded during the season.

The Maine State League began play on June 10, 1908. Lewiston moved to Augusta after twelve games. Pine Tree (15–13) and York Beach (10–15) both disbanded on July 19, 1908. When Portland withdrew on August 28, 1908, the Maine State League permanently folded. The Portland Blue Sox were in 1st place with a 32–20 record when disbanding. Portland finished ahead of the Bangor White Sox (31–22), Lewiston/Augusta (20–26) and Biddeford (18–30) in the standings. However, since Portland folded, Bangor was awarded the 1908 Maine State League championship.

Maine State League teams

Standings and statistics

1897 Maine State League

1907 Maine State League

1908 Maine State League

References

External link
Baseball Reference

Defunct minor baseball leagues in the United States
Baseball leagues in Maine
Baseball leagues in New Hampshire
Defunct professional sports leagues in the United States
Sports leagues established in 1897
Sports leagues disestablished in 1908